Transmissibility may have several meanings:

 Transmissibility (vibration)
 Transmissibility (electromagnetism)
 Transmissivity, fluid flow in porous media
 Transmissibility (structural dynamics)

In most contexts, transmissibility is related to permeability.

In medicine, transmissibility is a synonym for basic reproduction number and refers to transmission.

See also
 Transmitter, a device for propagating electronic signals
 Transmittance, in optics, the propagation of a light wave through a medium
 Transmissivity in hydraulics